Great Chesterford railway station is on the West Anglia Main Line serving the village of Great Chesterford in Essex, England. Its three-letter station code is GRC.

The station and all trains calling are operated by Greater Anglia.

The station was once the point where the Newmarket Railway left the London to  main line. This route was authorised in 1846, opened on 3 January 1848 for goods and to passengers three days later.

Services
All services at Great Chesterford are operated by Greater Anglia using  EMUs.

The typical off-peak service in trains per hour is:
 1 tph to London Liverpool Street
 1 tph to 

During the peak hours, the service is increased to 2 tph in each direction.

References

External links

Railway stations in Essex
DfT Category E stations
Former Great Eastern Railway stations
Greater Anglia franchise railway stations
Railway stations in Great Britain opened in 1845